Holiday Park may refer to:

Resort, a vacation resort
Holiday Park (Durham), a defunct football ground in England
Holiday Park, Germany, an amusement park in Germany
Holiday Park, Saskatoon, a neighbourhood in Saskatoon
In the United Kingdom, Ireland, Australia and New Zealand, a tourist campsite facility offering a wide range of accommodation styles